The Anson Davis House and Anson Davis Springhouse are historic buildings in Columbus, Ohio, United States. The house was listed on the National Register of Historic Places in 1975, and the springhouse in 1979. The two properties are the only remaining original structures from the once-extensive farm. The  estate was deeded to Anson Davis from his father Samuel, a veteran of the Revolutionary War.

House
The two-story brick residence was constructed in 1848. It features a 1.5-story ell, built in 1854, with two dormers added in 1926. Anson Davis's father Samuel selected the house's site and planned its construction.

Springhouse

The Anson Davis Springhouse, also on the property, is listed separately on the National Register. Samuel built the one-story brick springhouse building for his son around 1850.

See also
 National Register of Historic Places listings in Columbus, Ohio

References

Houses completed in 1848
Buildings and structures completed in 1850
National Register of Historic Places in Columbus, Ohio
Houses in Columbus, Ohio
Houses on the National Register of Historic Places in Ohio